The 2023 European Para Championships are to be the first edition of the European Para Championships to be held between 8 and 20 August 2023 in Rotterdam, Netherlands.

Sports
The following competitions are to take place:

Venues

Events will be held at the following venuses:

Participating nations
45 nations are expected to compete:

See also
2023 European Games

References

External links
European Para Championships
European Para Championships on Facebook
European Para Championships on Twitter

European Para Championships
 
Disabled multi-sport events
Multi-sport events in Europe
Multi-sport events